Malem may refer to:
 Malem, Ghent, a neighbourhood of Ghent, Belgium
 Malem, Kosrae, a municipality in the state of Kosrae in the Federated States of Micronesia